The Maschinengewehr (Schwarzlose) M. 7, also known as the Schwarzlose MG, is a medium machine-gun, used as a standard issue firearm in the Austro-Hungarian Army throughout World War I. It was utilized by the Dutch, Greek and Hungarian armies during World War II. It was routinely issued to Italian colonial troops, alongside the Mannlicher M1895 rifle.

The primary producers were the ŒWG in Steyr, and FÉG in Budapest.

History 

The Schwarzlose M. 7 was a belt-fed machine gun, usually mounted on a tripod, designed by the Prussian firearms designer Andreas Schwarzlose.
While its water-cooled barrel gave it an appearance broadly resembling the family of Maxim-derived machine-guns (such as the British Vickers and the German Maschinengewehr 08), internally the Schwarzlose was of a much simpler design, which made the weapon comparatively inexpensive to manufacture.
Its unusual delayed blowback mechanism contained only a single spring.
The initial variants of the M.7/12 had a cyclic rate of about 400 rounds/minute. During World War I this was increased to 580 rounds/minute by using a stronger mainspring.
The Schwarzlose was robust and reliable, if used in its intended role as an infantry weapon. It met with less success when it was used in roles it had not been designed for, unlike the highly adaptable Maxim-derived machine guns.

Production
The Schwarzlose enjoyed moderate export success in the years leading up to World War I. Apart from the armies of the Austro-Hungarian empire (8mm caliber) it was adopted by the armies of Greece (6.5mm caliber), the Netherlands (6.5mm caliber) and Sweden (using the 6.5×55mm cartridge and designated kulspruta m/1914). In addition, the British ammunition company Kynoch produced a machine gun based on the Schwarzlose patent in 1907, using the .303 British cartridge. The Netherlands used a modified version, the Schwarzlose M.08, in production from 1918 (2,006 made). After the First World War the Schwarzlose continued in use with the new nations that emerged from the fragments of the Austro-Hungarian empire. Captured examples of the Schwarzlose saw some sporadic use by Russian and Italian units during the First World War. During World War II the Schwarzlose saw limited action in North Africa as an anti-aircraft weapon in Italian service. It was also the standard MG issued to Italian colonial troops. Besides, captured Schwarzlose machine guns of various types saw service with second line units of the Nazi German army, especially during the desperate fighting that took place in the final phases of that conflict.

Overview

The Schwarzlose MG M.7 is a toggle-delayed blowback, water-cooled machine gun. The mechanism incorporates a device that oils cartridge cases to ease extraction.

Use as an infantry and naval weapon

For infantry use, the Schwarzlose was usually employed as a traditional, tripod mounted, heavy machine gun served by a crew of at least three soldiers, one of whom was the commander, usually an NCO, a gunner who carried the weapon, a third soldier who served as an ammunition carrier and loader and he would presumably also carry the tripod although in practice a fourth soldier might be added to the team to carry the tripod. Another less commonly seen method of deployment was the more compact 'backpack mount'. In this configuration the gun was fitted with a backwards folding bipod attached to the front of the water jacket near the muzzle. The backpack mount itself consisted of a square wooden frame with a metal socket in the center. When the gun was fully deployed the frame was laid on the ground, the gun's central mounting point that usually attached to a tripod now had a small mounting pin attached to it instead which was inserted into the mounting socket in the center of the wooden backpack frame and finally the bipod was folded forward. The Schwarzlose would also have seen service as a fortress weapon in which case it would have been deployed on a variety of heavy and specialized fixed mountings and it also saw some use as a naval weapon aboard ships. During World War I, the Schwarzlose was also pressed into service as an anti-aircraft gun, and, as such, it was deployed using a variety of (often improvised) mountings.

Use as a fortification weapon

After World War I the Schwarzlose equipped the armed forces of Czechoslovakia, where it was adapted (vz. 7/24) and manufactured (vz. 24) as the těžký kulomet vz. 7/24 (heavy machine gun model 7/24) by the Janeček factory (adapted from 8 mm calibre to standard Czechoslovak munition 7,92 Mauser). When Czechoslovakia started building fortifications against Nazi Germany in 1935-1938, light fortifications, known as types 36 and 37, were partially armed with the Schwarzlose vz. 7/24.

Use as an aircraft gun
Apart from its use as a heavy infantry machine gun and as an anti-aircraft weapon, the Schwarzlose saw service with the Austro-Hungarian Luftfahrtruppe during World War I as an aircraft machine gun, a role for which it was not entirely suited. The Schwarzlose was used both as a fixed forward firing gun and as a flexible, ring mounted, defensive weapon.

Synchronizing the Schwarzlose for use in fighters turned out to be a difficult engineering challenge. A critical factor in synchronization is the time delay between the trigger movement and the moment when the bullet leaves the barrel, as during this delay the propeller will continue to rotate, moving over an angle that also varies with engine rpm. Because of the relatively long delay time of the Schwarzlose M7/12, the synchronization systems that were developed could be operated safely only in a narrow band of engine rpm. Therefore, the Austro-Hungarian fighters were equipped with large and prominent tachometers in the cockpit. The M16 version of the gun could be synchronized with greater accuracy, but a widened engine rpm restriction still had to be respected, except for aircraft equipped with Daimler synchronization gear. The result was never entirely satisfactory and Austro-Hungarian aircraft thus armed usually carried the Kravics indicator to warn the pilot of a malfunction in the synchronization gear. The Kravics propeller hit indicator consisted of electric wiring wrapped around the critical area of the propeller blades, connected to a light in the cockpit by a slip ring on the propeller shaft. If the light went out, the pilot knew the propeller had been hit.

Until these synchronization problems had been overcome, it was not uncommon to see the Schwarzlose deployed in a removable forward firing Type-II VK gun container which had been developed by the Luftfahrtruppe's Versuchs Kompanie at Fischamend. The Type-II VK, which received the macabre nickname  'baby coffin'  due to its shape, is remarkable in that it was possibly the first example of what today would be called a gun pod. It was usually mounted on the centerline of the upper wing of Austro-Hungarian fighters and two-seat combat aircraft during the early phases of World War I and remained in use on two-seat combat aircraft until the end of the war. In its role as an aircraft weapon, the Schwarzlose was initially used unmodified — other than that the distinctive cone shaped flash-hider seen on most of the infantry weapons was removed. The Schwarzlose was further modified for aircraft use, much as the German Empire's own lMG 08 Spandau ordnance had been modified early in 1915, by cutting slots into the water jacket's sheetmetal to facilitate air cooling. In 1916, the water jacket was removed entirely, and the resulting weapon was re-designated as the Schwarzlose MG-16 and MG-16A when fitted with a stronger spring and a blowback enhancer to increase the gun's cyclic rate, which was eventually brought up to 880 rounds per minute in some versions of the MG-16A. As a defensive ring-mounted gun, the Schwarzlose usually retained its normal twin firing handles and trigger button, although some MG-16 aircraft guns were fitted with enlarged pistol-shaped handles and a handgun-style trigger. All ring-mounted defensive guns were equipped with specialized sights and a box for the ammunition belt, which allowed quick and trouble-free reloading. After the end of World War I, the Schwarzlose saw limited use as an aircraft gun with various East European air forces. The best-known post-war operator of the Schwarzlose was probably the Polish air force, who acquired and used significant numbers of surplus Austro-Hungarian aircraft and used them against Soviet forces during the Polish-Soviet War. The Schwarzlose was, however, quickly phased out of service as an aircraft weapon when more suitable equipment became available.

Variants

Austro-Hungarian
MG M.7, MG M.7/12, MG-16, MG-16A in 8×50mmR Mannlicher.

British
Kynoch Machine Gun was manufactured by the Kynoch ammunition company, presumably in .303 British,

Czechoslovak

Schwarzlose-Janeček vz.07/24 (or vz. 24, or Š 24): The M.7/12 Machine Gun was modified by inventor František Janeček. Modifications include: rechambering to 7.92×57 mm Mauser, a lighter bolt, shorter recoil spring and extension of the barrel by 100 mm. Manufacture and adaptation of these guns took place in the Zbrojovka Brno factory. During 1922 and 1934 there were 4937 modified Schwarzlose M.7/12 MGs to vz.7/24 and 2253 newly produced vz.24 MGs.

Dutch
M08, M08/13, M08/15 in 6.5×53mmR.

Hungarian
MG M.07/31 converted from original 8×50mmR Mannlicher to 8×56mmR. Same as their Mannlicher M1895 rifles.

Swedish

Kulspruta m/1914 in 6.5×55mm. First 511 guns were bought from the ŒWG, but starting from 1917 Sweden began producing them at Carl Gustafs Stads Gevärsfaktori state small arms factory in Eskilstuna, where additional 753 were produced using tooling acquired from ŒWG after the WWI. Its m/14 tripod design was so liked by the Swedish military that it remained even after it the gun itself was superseded by Browning, and stayed in service until 1980.

Users

:During the Constitutionalist revolution a number were imported from Czechoslosvakia by Governor Flores da Cunha of Rio Grande do Sul; these were later issued to the Military Brigade during the Campanha da Legalidade

: used in the Colombia–Peru War in 1933.

: Used by Swedish volunteer unit (SFK) during Winter War.
: Adopted as the Schweres Maschinengewehr 7/12(ö).

: Model 1907/12 in 8mm. Converted to 7.62×54mmR, metal belt feeding and fitted with a larger water jacket. Around 1,000 of these machine guns were converted to 7.92×57mm Mauser and remained in service during World War II with the border guards and marines, and occasionally as anti-aircraft guns. 

: Used in the Austro-Slovene conflict in Carinthia, later passed on to the Kingdom of Yugoslavia.

: Adopted as the Kulspruta m/1914 in 6.5×55mm cartridge.
: Model 1907/12 in 8mm
: Used by partisans in World War II.
Used by Jewish partisans during the 1947–48 Civil War in Mandatory Palestine.
: 6.5mm Arisaka version was used by Imperial Japanese Navy during Inter-War Era. It was equipped on Fusō-class battleship and Kongō-class battlecruiser.

References
Notes

Sources

External links 

 Photogallery, probably of Czech heavy machine gun model 7/24.

 Animation showing mechanism of Schwarzlose machine gun.

 - Explanation of how the gun works.

8 mm machine guns
Machine guns of Austria
Machine guns of Czechoslovakia
Machine guns of Sweden
Early machine guns
Medium machine guns
Weapons of the Ottoman Empire
Heavy machine guns
Weapons of Austria-Hungary
World War I aircraft guns
World War I machine guns
World War I Austro-Hungarian infantry weapons
World War II infantry weapons of Germany
World War II infantry weapons of Poland
World War II machine guns
Delayed blowback firearms
Weapons and ammunition introduced in 1902